Wunnava Venkata Varaha Buchi Ramalingam was an Indian independence activist from Berhampur in the Ganjam district of the erstwhile Madras Presidency of British India. He was a mathematics teacher and vice-principal at Khallikote College, president of the Bengal and Nagpur Railway Associations and also a road contractor.

References 

1884 births
Indian schoolteachers
Indian independence activists from Tamil Nadu
People from Odisha
1962 deaths
Presidency College, Chennai alumni